The Mid-South is an informally-defined region of the United States, usually thought to be anchored by the Memphis metropolitan area and consisting of West Tennessee, North Mississippi, Southern Missouri,  Western Kentucky, Central, Northeast, and Eastern Arkansas, Northwest Alabama and even Eastern Oklahoma. Southern Illinois (especially Cairo, shown on the map) and Southwestern Indiana are sometimes included in this region. 

Although the region has no formally established boundaries, the designation has been used by various businesses and institutions generally operating in the region. In 1920, journalist C.P.J. Mooney equated the region with the Mississippi River Valley, centered in Memphis, and described by advocates as "the richest agricultural region in the world". Mooney delineated the region as "covering West Kentucky, West Tennessee, part of the Tennessee River Valley in Alabama, the northern half of Mississippi, the Eastern half of Arkansas and southeast Missouri".

Victory University, located in Memphis, was originally named the Mid-South Bible Center when it was incorporated in 1944, and was thereafter renamed to the Mid-South Bible Institute in 1948, and to the Mid-South Bible College in 1960. From 1981 to 1987, a Mid-South Business Journal was also in publication. The Mid-South Conference is an NAIA sports conference with member schools in the region.

References

Regions of the Southern United States